Dessau  was an engineering consulting firm. It was the fifth-largest engineering-construction firm in Canada and was ranked 57th in the world. The company traced its origins to 1957, when Jean-Claude Desjardins and Paul-Aimé Sauriol founded an engineering consulting firm by the name of Desjardins & Sauriol. Active in both national and international markets, the firm employed 4,800 people and posted annual revenues of $750 million . The company had offices in North Africa, Central America, South America and the Caribbean. Dessau was one of "Canada’s 50 Best Managed Companies."

History

In September 1957, provincial highway engineer Jean-Claude Desjardins met with Paul-Aimé Sauriol, who ran a small engineering consultancy in Île Jésus, Quebec, after a mutual friend suggested they explore the possibility of working together. By the end of that year, the two men founded Desjardins & Sauriol, ingénieurs-conseils.

In Quebec, the following years marked the onset of the Quiet Revolution, a heady period of rapid change for both the province as well as Desjardins & Sauriol, whose business had grown to 30 employees by 1961. The province was brimming with engineering-construction megaprojects and the firm landed numerous transportation and municipal engineering contracts, expanding its business to include geotechnical, structural, electrical and mechanical departments.

The James Bay hydroelectric project, dubbed by then-premier Robert Bourassa as Quebec's "Project of the Century", would earn the company national recognition and set the stage for the Dessau's international expansion. With a generating capacity of 16,000 MW and spanning an area the size of New York State, James Bay featured one of the largest hydroelectric systems in the world. Headquartered in Matagami, Dessau's team oversaw soil studies, layout verification, logistics and the building of a strategic road through forests and other unforgiving landscape elements. A multidisciplinary team of engineers, geologists, surveyors, loggers, bush pilots, laborers, truckers and technicians was mobilized and they managed to complete the project a full year ahead of schedule.

In 1975, Dessau was mandated to build a new national highway in Zaire and three years later Dessau International was born.

The 1980s saw Dessau's international experience expand but also witnessed the company's first tangible steps in the field of environmental sustainability and energy efficiency. Since the early 1980s, Dessau has espoused a "green dream", from restoring waterways in the greater Montreal area to more recent conservation plans that now play a key role in Quebec's energy strategy.

The 1990s were marked by a series of strategic mergers and acquisitions.

While Dessau continues to take on an increasing number of major international projects, such as the East-West Highway in Algeria, SIEPAC Central American electric grid interconnection project or the Guajimia Canal in the Dominican Republic, the firm's leadership maintains a high premium on retaining the company's position as a key player in the Quebec engineering market.

In 2013, Rosaire Sauriol, Vice President of Dessau Engineering, left the company, just days after his testimony at the Charbonneau Commission. He confessed that Dessau had participated in a system of collusion in Montreal between 2000 and 2010 in which he helped organize $2 million of false billings to help finance political parties.

Major Projects 

2012: Bridge design for a structure spanning the Magdalena River – Colombia

2011: Quality control during the construction of a 4.2 km runway at Calgary International Airport – Calgary, Canada

2010: Construction of the Centre hospitalier de l'Université de Montréal – Research Centre (CR-CHUM) – Montreal, Canada

2010: 1,200-km East-West Highway – Algeria

2010: Guajimia Canal sewage treatment – Santo Domingo, Dominican Republic

2010: Montreal metro  fixed equipment and systems upgrades – Montreal, Canada

2008: Trinidad rapid rail project – Trinidad and Tobago

2008: SIEPAC Central American Electrical Interconnection System – San José, Costa Rica

2007: Great Mosque of Algiers  – Algeria

2006: Redevelopment of the LeBreton Flats – Ottawa, Canada

2005: Construction and expansion of Campanario thermoelectric power plant – Chile

2004: Acadie Circle reconstruction – Montreal, Canada

2002: Palais des congrès de Montréal Convention Centre – Montreal, Canada

2000: Rural electrification project supervision – Peru

1990: Canadian Museum of Civilization – Gatineau, Canada

1975: James Bay hydroelectric project – Quebec, Canada

Offices 
Dessau operates nearly 80 offices in Canada, Algeria, the Caribbean and Latin America (Chile, Colombia, Costa Rica, Peru, Dominican Republic, Trinidad and Tobago).

Areas of Expertise

Subsidiaries

Projects

Projects from 1957 to 1969

Projects from 1970 to 1979

Projects from 1980 to 1989

Projects from 1990 to 1999

Projects from 2000 to 2009

Projects from 2010 to 2015

Stantec
On 24 September 2014, Stantec announced that they would acquire the engineering assets of Dessau. The acquisition was completed in January 2015.

References

Construction and civil engineering companies of Canada
Companies based in Montreal
Construction and civil engineering companies established in 1957
Canadian companies established in 1957